Leopoldo Pirelli (Velate, 1925 – Portofino, January 23, 2007) was an Italian heir and businessman.

Early life
Leopoldo Pirelli was born in 1925 in Velate, Italy. His father was the prominent Italian industrialist Alberto Pirelli and his mother was Lodovica Zambeletti, daughter of the pharmaceutical industrialist Leopoldo Zambeletti. His paternal grandfather, Giovanni Battista Pirelli, was the founder of Pirelli.

Career
Pirelli joined Pirelli as a member of the Pirelli SpA board in 1954 and appointed deputy chairman serving from 1956 to 1965. He serves as its president from 1965 to 1996. In 1992, he remained chairman but let his son-in-law, Marco Tronchetti Provera, take over as managing director and executive deputy chairman.

Personal life
Pirelli had his wife Giulia Ferlito had a daughter, Cecilia (1952, married secondly to Marco Tronchetti Provera), and a son, Alberto (1954).

Death
Pirelli died on January 23, 2007, in Portofino, Italy.

References

1925 births
2007 deaths
20th-century Italian businesspeople
Pirelli people